John Pearson (January 30, 1902 – April 23, 1984) was an American gymnast who competed in the 1924 Summer Olympics and in the 1928 Summer Olympics.

References

1902 births
1984 deaths
American male artistic gymnasts
Olympic gymnasts of the United States
Gymnasts at the 1924 Summer Olympics
Gymnasts at the 1928 Summer Olympics